Ellen Simpson is an American writer. She is known for her work as story editor and social media writer for the web series Carmilla. She also has published several novels with Ylva Publishing.  Simpson identifies as a lesbian.

Career 
In 2014, Simpson developed the web series Carmilla with Jordan Hall for SmokeBomb Entertainment.

The series premiered on the Vervegirl (rebranded as 'KindaTV' as of January 2016) YouTube channel on August 19, 2014.U by Kotex is the executive producer of the web series. The series takes place at the fictional Silas University in Styria, Austria and is told through video journals (Vlogs) recorded by Laura, a first-year student. The first and second seasons each consist of 36 three to seven-minute episodes. A twelve-episode prequel mini-season, "season zero," was announced just after the release of the final episode of season 2. In 2016, the series won a Canadian Screen Award as well as Rockie Award for Branded Content at the Banff World Media Festival.

Simpson is currently a PhD student in the department of Information Science at the University of Colorado Boulder.

References

Living people
Web series directors
Year of birth missing (living people)
American writers
American LGBT writers